Oko (ɔ̀kɔ́), also known as Ogori-Magongo and Oko-Eni-Osayin, is a dialect cluster spoken in Nigeria. It appears to form a branch of the "Nupe–Oko–Idoma" group of Niger–Congo languages. Most Oko speakers also speak Yoruba as a second language. The language is spoken in and around the towns of Ogori and Magongo in southwestern Kogi State, close to the Ondo and Edo state borders.

Classification
Oko is one of the Volta–Niger languages.

An automated computational analysis (ASJP 4) by Müller et al. (2013) grouped Oko within the Idomoid languages.

Distribution
According to Ethnologue, Oko is spoken in:
Edo State: Akoko-Edo LGA
Kogi State: Okene LGA, Magongo, and Ogori towns

Varieties
Oko is a dialect cluster consisting of (Ethnologue):
Oko (Ogori, Uku)
Osayin(Magongo, Osanyin)
Eni

Below is a list of Ọkọ–Eni–Ọsayin language cluster names, populations, and locations from Blench (2019).

Phonology

Consonants

Vowels

Each vowel also has a nasal equivalent.

See also
Oko word list (Wiktionary)

References

Volta–Niger languages